Angels is a 1990 Spanish-Swiss drama film directed by Jacob Berger. It was entered into the 40th Berlin International Film Festival.

Cast
 Belinda Becker as Sara
 Steven Weber as Rickie
 Jose Esteban as Tonio
 José Esteban Alenda (as José Esteban hijo)
 Justin Williams as Thomas
 Féodor Atkine as Hugo Carrero
 Ángela Molina as Natacha
 Cristina Hoyos as La Molina
 Dolors Ducastella as Leila Michelson
 Lloll Bertran as Girl with the scar
 Yolanda Herrero as Girl with the golden teeth
 Àngels Aymar as Girl with bubble-gum

References

External links

1990 films
1990s French-language films
1990 drama films
Films directed by Jacob Berger
Spanish drama films
Swiss drama films
French-language Swiss films
1990s Spanish films